A by-election was held in the federal riding of Ottawa—Vanier in Ontario, Canada on 3 April 2017 following the death of Mauril Bélanger on August 16, 2016. The safe seat was held by the Liberal candidate Mona Fortier on a reduced majority.

The by-election was scheduled to coincide with four others across the country; Calgary Heritage, Calgary Midnapore, Markham—Thornhill and Saint-Laurent.

Background

Constituency 

The riding, with a large Franco-Ontarian population in Vanier, is one of the most solidly Liberal in the country, having elected Liberals both federally and provincially in every election since its creation. In fact, the previous electoral district which comprises most of the constituency, Russell, had been solidly Liberal since 1887. The riding is home to many civil servants and generally corresponds to the wards of Beacon Hill-Cyrville, Rideau-Rockcliffe and Rideau-Vanier.

Representation 
Mauril Bélanger until his death on August 16, 2016, from amyotrophic lateral sclerosis (also known as Lou Gehrig's disease). The riding was one of the most solidly Liberal in the country, having elected Liberals both federally and provincially in every election since its creation in 1935. The Speaker's warrant regarding the vacancy was received on August 23, 2016.

Candidates 
After several prominent potential candidates, including Bélanger's widow Catherine Bélanger, Ottawa councillors Tobi Nussbaum and Tim Tierney, and 2014 council candidate Catherine Fortin LeFaivre declined to run, eight candidates sought the Liberal nomination: Senate staffer Khatera Akbari, lawyer Jean Claude Dubuisson, communications consultant Mona Fortier, Liberal staffer Eric Khaiat, former Cape Breton Highlands—Canso MP Francis LeBlanc, public servant Ainsley Malhotra, former executive director of The Humanitarian Coalition Nicolas Moyer, and Unique FM executive director Véronique Soucy. Up to 6,500 party members were eligible to vote in the nomination contest. Mona Fortier won the nomination on February 5, 2017.

Unsuccessful 2015 candidate Emilie Taman, a University of Ottawa law professor and daughter of former Supreme Court Justice Louise Arbour, ran again for the NDP.

Parliament Hill staffer Adrian Papara defeated former New Brunswick MLA Joel Bernard for the Conservative Party nomination, decided on February 16.

Educator and community activist Nira Dookeran was the Green candidate.

Results

2015 results

References 

2017 elections in Canada
2017 in Ontario
Federal by-elections in Ontario
Politics of Ottawa
April 2017 events in Canada